In enzymology, a L-fucose isomerase is an enzyme that catalyzes the chemical reaction

L-fucose  L-fuculose

Hence, this enzyme has one substrate, L-fucose, and one product, L-fuculose.

This enzyme belongs to the family of isomerases, specifically those intramolecular oxidoreductases interconverting aldoses and ketoses.  The systematic name of this enzyme class is L-fucose aldose-ketose-isomerase. This enzyme participates in fructose and mannose metabolism.

The enzyme is a hexamer, forming the largest structurally known ketol isomerase, and has no sequence or structural similarity with other ketol isomerases. The structure was determined by X-ray crystallography at 2.5 Angstrom resolution. Each subunit of the hexameric enzyme is wedge-shaped and composed of three domains. Both domains 1 and 2 contain central parallel beta- sheets with surrounding alpha helices. The active centre is shared between pairs of subunits related along the molecular three-fold axis, with domains 2 and 3 from one subunit providing most of the substrate-contacting residues.

References

Further reading
 

Protein domains
EC 5.3.1
Enzymes of unknown structure